Nathan Michael Collins (born 30 April 2001) is an Irish professional footballer who plays as a centre-back for Premier League club Wolverhampton Wanderers and the Republic of Ireland national team.

Early life
Collins was born in Leixlip, County Kildare.

Club career

Stoke City
Collins began his career with youth club Cherry Orchard, where his father David and uncle Eamonn both started their careers. He joined English club Stoke City in January 2016 after being recommended by scout Tony Bowen, assistant manager Mark Bowen's brother. Collins made his first-team debut on 9 April 2019 away at Swansea City. His first start came ten days later when he played the full 90 minutes of Stoke's 1–0 loss away to Middlesbrough at the Riverside Stadium. Collins signed a new five-year contract with Stoke in July 2019.

Collins started the first few matches of the 2019–20 season and was given the captain's armband by Nathan Jones against Leeds United, becoming Stoke's youngest captain in the process. He was sent off for the first time in his career in an EFL Cup defeat at Crawley Town for a mis-timed challenge on Panutche Camará. Collins remained on the fringes of the first team for the rest of the season under the management of Michael O'Neill, making a total of 17 appearances in 2019–20. Collins played 27 times in 2020–21 before he suffered a season ending foot injury playing against Norwich City on 13 February 2021.

Burnley
On 24 June 2021, Collins joined Premier League club Burnley for an undisclosed fee, signing a four-year contract with the club. He scored his first two goals for the club in a pair of home ties during April 2022, against Everton and Southampton. Collins became a key member of Burnley's side in the second half of the 2021–22 season as the side fought against relegation. Burnley were relegated after a 2–1 defeat against Newcastle United on the final day of the season.

Wolverhampton Wanderers
On 12 July 2022, Collins signed for Premier League club Wolverhampton Wanderers on a five-year contract for a fee of £20.5 million, an all-time record transfer fee for an Irish player.

Collins made his debut competitive appearance for Wolves in 2–1 defeat away to Leeds United on the opening weekend of the 2022–23 Premier League season, playing the full 90 minutes in central defensive pairing with Max Kilman.

Collins received a straight red card for a high challenge on Jack Grealish during the first-half of Wolves's home Premier League game against Manchester City on 17 September 2022, resulting in a three-match suspension. The game ended in a 3–0 loss.

International career
Collins made his Republic of Ireland U17 debut against Kazakhstan on 17 October 2016 and was later made captain of the team. He made his senior debut on 12 October 2021, coming on as a late substitute in a 4–0 friendly victory against Qatar. On 14 June 2022, Collins scored his first goal for Ireland in a 1-1 draw with Ukraine in the UEFA Nations League.

Personal life
Collins' family includes a number of other footballers, including his grandfather, Michael Collins who captained Transport to the FAI Cup in 1950, his father Dave Collins who played with Liverpool and Oxford United among others. His uncle, Eamonn Collins, played with many sides including Southampton and Portsmouth before going on to manage St Patrick's Athletic and later becoming a football agent, with his clients including Nathan Collins. His older brother Josh Collins previously played for UCD and Waterford in the League of Ireland Premier Division. Nathan's uncle Mick Collins played for St Patrick's Athletic and Dundalk before later becoming a scout at Manchester City for 20 years, his son Mikey Collins (Nathan's cousin) is also an ex-footballer who played for Liverpool in his youth career before playing in Sweden, Italy, Cyprus and Holland, as well as representing Ireland up to U21 level.

Career statistics

Club

International

Scores and results list Ireland's goal tally first, score column indicates score after each Collins goal

References

External links
Profile at the Wolverhampton Wanderers F.C. website
Profile at the Football Association of Ireland website

2001 births
Living people
People from Leixlip
Association footballers from County Kildare
Republic of Ireland association footballers
Association football defenders
Cherry Orchard F.C. players
Stoke City F.C. players
Burnley F.C. players
Wolverhampton Wanderers F.C. players
English Football League players
Premier League players
Republic of Ireland youth international footballers
Republic of Ireland under-21 international footballers
Republic of Ireland international footballers
Republic of Ireland expatriate association footballers
Expatriate footballers in England
Irish expatriate sportspeople in England